The  (the Rhineland State Museum, or the State Museum of the Rhine) may refer to either of two sister museums in the Rhineland:
 Rheinisches Landesmuseum Bonn
 Rheinisches Landesmuseum Trier

 becomes  when used without a definite article (a strong inflection).

Buildings and structures disambiguation pages